Firuzabad ( or Piruzabad, also Romanized as Fīrūzābād; Middle Persian: Gōr or Ardashir-Khwarrah, literally "The Glory of Ardashir"; also Shahr-e Gūr ) is a city and capital of Firuzabad County, Fars Province, Iran.  At the 2006 census, its population was 58,210, in 12,888 families. Firuzabad is located south of Shiraz. The city is surrounded by a mud wall and ditch.

The original ancient city of Gor, dating back to the Achaemenid period, was destroyed by Alexander the Great. Centuries later, Ardashir I, the founder of the Sassanid Empire, revived the city before it was ransacked during the Arab Muslim invasion of the seventh century. It was again revived by the Buyids under Fanna Khusraw, but was eventually abandoned in the Qajar period and was replaced by a nearby town, which is now Firuzabad. Its only surviving structure is the central core an ancient tower.

History 

Gor dates back to the Achaemenid era. It was situated in a low-lying area of the region, so, during his invasion of Persia, Alexander the Great was able to drown the city by directing the flow of a river into the city. The lake he created remained until Ardashir I built a tunnel to drain it. He founded his new capital city on this site.

Ardashir's new city was known as Khor Ardashīr, Ardashīr Khurrah and Gōr. It had a circular plan so precise in measurement that the Persian historian Ibn Balkhi wrote it to be "devised using a compass". It was protected by a trench 50 meters in width, and was 2 kilometers in diameter. The city had four gates; to the north was the Hormozd Gate, to the south the Ardashir Gate, to the east the Mithra Gate and to the west the Wahram Gate. The royal capital's compounds were constructed at the center of a circle 450 m in radius. At the center of the town there was a lofty platform or tower, called Terbal. It was 30 m high and spiral in design. The design is unique in Iran, and there are several theories regarding the purpose of its construction. It is thought to have been the architectural predecessor of the Great Mosque of Samarra of Iraq and its distinctive minaret, the malwiya. In the Sasanian period, the abbreviation ART (in Inscriptional Pahlavi) was used as the mint signature to refer to Gōr.

Gōr and Istakhr strenuously resisted the invading Arab Muslims in the 630s and 640s; they were conquered by Abdallah ibn Amr in 649–50.

The city's importance was revived again in the reign of Fanna Khusraw of the Buyid dynasty, who frequently used the city as his residence. It is at this time that the old name of the city, Gōr, was abandoned in favor of the new. In New Persian, spoken at the time, the word Gōr had come to mean "grave." King Adud al-Dawla, as the story goes, found it distasteful to reside in a "grave." Per his instruction, the city's name was changed to Peroz-abad, "City of Victory." Since then, the city has been known by variations of that name, including Firuzabad ( Fīrūzābād). However, there is a 7th-century Arab-Sassanian coin from Ardashir-Khwarra during Umayyad period in which pylwj'b'd (Pahlavi; Pērōzābād) is mentioned as the mint.

The city was eventually abandoned in Qajar period and its nearby settlement was populated, which is now the modern Firuzabad located 3 km to the east of the site of Gor. Today, among the attractions of Firuzabad are the Sassanid Ghal'eh Dokhtar, the Palace of Ardeshir, and the fire temple and its nearby Minar.

According to a 1939 publication of the anthropologist Henry Field, 7,000 Circassians lived in Firuzabad.

The city has five universities: Firuzabad Higher education university, Islamic Azad University, Firuzabad Branch; Payame Noor University, Firuzabad center; a branch of Technical and Vocational University; and a branch of University of Applied Science and Technology.

Climate
Firuzabad has a hot semi-arid climate (Köppen climate classification: BSh).

See also

 Ghal'eh Dokhtar in Firuzabad
 Palace of Ardeshir in Firuzabad
 Bishapur
 Cities of the Ancient Near East
 Round city of Baghdad, modeled after Firuzabad and other Parthian and Sassanian round cities

References

Sources

External links
 Ernst Herzfeld Papers, Series 5: Drawings and Maps, Records of Firuzabad  Collections Search Center, S.I.R.I.S., Smithsonian Institution, Washington, D.C.
 
 Fars Cultural Heritage Organization

Populated places in Firuzabad County
Cities in Fars Province
Architecture in Iran
Sasanian cities
Ardashir I
Gor (Sasanian city)